Mensa is the largest and oldest high-IQ society in the world. It is a non-profit organisation open to people who score at the 98th percentile or higher on a standardised, supervised IQ or other approved intelligence test. Mensa formally comprises national groups and the umbrella organisation Mensa International, with a registered office in Caythorpe, Lincolnshire, England, which is separate from the British Mensa office in Wolverhampton. The word mensa is Latin for 'table', as is symbolised in the organisation's logo, and was chosen to demonstrate the round-table nature of the organisation; the coming together of equals.

History
Roland Berrill, an Australian barrister, and Lancelot Ware, a British scientist and lawyer, founded Mensa at Lincoln College, in Oxford, England in 1946, with the intention of forming a society for the most intelligent, with the only qualification being a high IQ.

The society was ostensibly to be non-political in its aims and free from all other social distinctions, such as race and religion. However, Berrill and Ware were both disappointed with the resulting society. Berrill had intended Mensa as "an aristocracy of the intellect" and was unhappy that the majority of members came from working or lower-class homes, while Ware said: "I do get disappointed that so many members spend so much time solving puzzles."

American Mensa was the second major branch of Mensa. Its success has been linked to the efforts of early and longstanding organiser Margot Seitelman.

In 2021, British Mensa's web servers suffered a security breach in which member data was compromised. Two board directors resigned because of the relaxed cybersecurity.

Membership requirement
Mensa's requirement for membership is a score at or above the 98th percentile on certain standardized IQ or other approved intelligence tests, such as the Stanford–Binet Intelligence Scales. The minimum accepted score on the Stanford–Binet is 132, while for the Cattell it is 148 and 130 in the Wechsler tests (WAIS, WISC). Most IQ tests are designed to yield a mean score of 100 with a standard deviation of 15; the 98th-percentile score under these conditions is 131, assuming a normal distribution.

Most national groups test using well-established IQ test batteries, but American Mensa additionally developed its own application exam. This exam is administered and monitored by American Mensa and does not provide a score comparable to scores on other tests; it serves only to qualify a person for membership. In some national groups, a person may take a Mensa-offered test only once, although one may later submit an application with results from a different qualifying test. The Mensa test is also available in some developing countries such as India and Pakistan, and societies in developing countries have been growing at a rapid pace.

Organizational structure
Mensa International consists of around 134,000 members in 100 countries  and in 54 national groups. The national groups issue periodicals, such as Mensa Bulletin, the monthly publication of American Mensa, and Mensa Magazine, the monthly publication of British Mensa. Individuals who live in a country with a national group join the national group, while those living in countries without a recognized chapter may join Mensa International directly.

The largest national groups are: 
 American Mensa, with more than 57,000 members,
 British Mensa, with over 21,000 members,
 Mensa Germany, with about 15,000 members.
Larger national groups are further subdivided into local groups. For example, American Mensa has 134 local groups, with the largest having over 2,000 members and the smallest having fewer than 100.

Members may form Special Interest Groups (SIGs) at international, national, and local levels; these SIGs represent a wide variety of interests, ranging from motorcycle clubs to entrepreneurial co-operations. Some SIGs are associated with various geographic groups, whereas others act independently of official hierarchy. There are also electronic SIGs (eSIGs), which operate primarily as email lists, where members may or may not meet each other in person.

The Mensa Foundation, a separate charitable U.S. corporation, edits and publishes its own Mensa Research Journal, in which both Mensans and non-Mensans are published on various topics surrounding the concept and measure of intelligence.

Gatherings
Mensa has many events for members, from the local to the international level. Several countries hold a large event called the Annual Gathering (AG). It is held in a different city every year, with speakers, dances, leadership workshops, children's events, games, and other activities. The American and Canadian AGs are usually held during the American Independence Day (4 July) or Canada Day (1 July) weekends respectively.

Smaller gatherings called Regional Gatherings (RGs), which are held in various cities, attract members from large areas. The largest in the United States is held in the Chicago area around Halloween, notably featuring a costume party for which many members create pun-based costumes.

In 2006, the Mensa World Gathering was held from 8–13 August in Orlando, Florida to celebrate the 60th anniversary of the founding of Mensa. An estimated 2,500 attendees from over 30 countries gathered for this celebration. The International Board of Directors had a formal meeting there.

In 2010, a joint American-Canadian Annual Gathering was held in Dearborn, Michigan, to mark the 50th anniversary of Mensa in North America, one of several times the US and Canada AGs have been combined. Other multinational gatherings are the European Mensas Annual Gathering (EMAG) and the Asian Mensa Gathering (AMG).

Since 1990, American Mensa has sponsored the annual Mensa Mind Games competition, at which the Mensa Select award is given to five board games that are "original, challenging, and well designed".

Individual local groups and their members host smaller events for members and their guests. Lunch or dinner events, lectures, tours, theatre outings, and games nights are all common.

In Europe, since 2008 international meetings have been held under the name [EMAG] (European Mensa Annual Gathering), starting in Cologne that year. The next meetings were in Utrecht (2009), Prague (2010), Paris (2011), Stockholm (2012), Bratislava (2013), Zürich (2014), Berlin (2015), Kraków (2016), Barcelona (2017), Belgrade (2018) and Ghent (2019). The 2020 event was postponed and took place in 2021 in Brno. The 2022 event was held in Strasbourg, and the following year's event will be held in Rotterdam (2023).

In the Asia-Pacific region, there is an Asia-Pacific Mensa Annual Gathering (AMAG), with rotating countries hosting the event. This has included Gold Coast, Australia (2017), Cebu, Philippines (2018), New Zealand (2019), and South Korea (2020).

Publications
All national Mensa groups publish members-only newsletters or magazines, which include articles and columns written by members, and information about upcoming Mensa events. Examples include the American Mensa Bulletin, the British Mensa Magazine, Serbian MozaIQ, the Australian TableAus, the Mexican El Mensajero, and the French Contacts. Aside from national publications, some local or regional groups have their own newsletters.

Mensa International publishes a Mensa World Journal, which "contains views and information about Mensa around the world". This journal is generally included in each national magazine.

The Mensa Foundation publishes the Mensa Research Journal, which "highlights scholarly articles and recent research related to intelligence". Unlike most Mensa publications, this journal is available to non-members.

Demographics
All national Mensas have to accept children. However, some national Mensas don't test the children themselves; many offer activities, resources, and newsletters specifically geared toward gifted children and their parents. American Mensa's youngest member (Kashe Quest), British Mensa's youngest member (Adam Kirby), and several Australian Mensa members joined at the age of two. The current youngest member of Mensa is Adam Kirby, from Mitcham, London who was invited to join at the age of two years and four months and gained full membership at the age of two years five months. He scored 141 on the Stanford-Binet IQ test. Elise Tan-Roberts of the UK is the youngest person ever to join Mensa, having gained full membership at the age of two years and four months. In 2018, Mehul Garg became the youngest person in a decade to score the maximum of 162 in the test.

American Mensa's oldest member is 102, and British Mensa had a member aged 103.

Detailed International Mensa demographics are not generally published.

According to American Mensa's generational classifications and published demographics (as of 2023), its membership is 8 percent from the Silent generation (born 1924-1942), 37 percent Baby Boomers (born 1943-1960), 30 percent Gen-X (born 1961-1981), 10 percent Millennial (born 1982-2000), 12 percent Generation Z (born 2001-2020) and the remaining 3 percent other. The American Mensa general membership identifies as 64 percent male, 32 percent female, 3 percent unknown, and less than 1 percent gender non-conforming or other.

See also
 List of notable Mensans
 List of Mensa Select recipients
 IQ classification
 IQ Award
 Triple Nine Society
 Intertel, high-IQ society

References

External links

  (alternative URL)
 Map of Mensa National Groups

 
1946 establishments in England
Organizations established in 1946